Saul Holiff (June 22, 1925 – March 17, 2005) was a Canadian music promoter and Johnny Cash's manager for thirteen years.

Saul Holiff was born in London, Ontario, on June 22, 1925. He dropped out of high school, the London Central Collegiate Institute, when he was fifteen, delivered newspapers, ran a fruit and vegetable business, worked as a truck driver, a puddler at the Steel Company of Canada, a traveling salesman and a self-employed clothing merchant. During World War II he trained as a rear air gunner in the Royal Canadian Air Force. In the 1950s he performed at London's Grand Theatre in a variety of roles before becoming a concert promoter and manager with offices in London, Los Angeles and Nashville.

He promoted such acts as Bill Haley and the Comets, Paul Anka and Johnny Cash through smaller venues such as his own restaurant, Sol’s Square Boy. Holiff managed Johnny Cash’s career from 1960 to 1973. He also managed Tommy Hunter, Debbie Lori Kaye and The Statler Brothers. In 1961 Holiff was responsible for introducing singer June Carter into Cash’s act.

In 1970 Holiff won a Gold Leaf Award for 'Canadian Industry Music Industry Man of the Year', the Gold Leaf Awards were the precursor to the Juno Awards.

Cash and Holiff had a tumultuous relationship, which is highlighted in the 2012 film My Father and the Man in Black, an award-winning documentary created by Holiff's son Jonathan.

Holiff negotiated a $75,000 settlement agreement with Gordon Jenkins because of the similarity of Cash’s hit Folsom Prison Blues to a Jenkins song. https://www.fyimusicnews.ca/articles/2017/07/07/saul-holiff-johnny-cash-and-making-american-icon

After he quit as Cash's manager in 1973 he retired from show business and enrolled at the University of Victoria, where he obtained a bachelor's degree in history.

Holiff committed suicide on March 17, 2005, in Nanaimo, British Columbia.

In 2018 he was awarded a posthumous lifetime achievement award at the Forrest City London Music Awards.

Further reading

References 

 

2005 deaths
1925 births
People from London, Ontario
Juno Award winners
Canadian music managers